The Kaffir Diamond is an 1888 play. It had its New York City debut at the former Broadway Theatre on September 11, 1888.  Though the audience provided "unbounded applause" on opening night, reviews of the play were negative, and it played unsuccessfully for only five weeks, concluding on October 13, 1888.

The play was intended as a starring vehicle for Louis Aldrich.  Edward J. Swartz, a Philadelphia newspaperman with the Philadelphia Evening Telegraph wrote the play, and David Belasco worked on revising it and assisted in getting the play staged.

Original Broadway cast
"Shoulders" by Louis Aldrich
Col. Richard Grantly by Frazer Coulter
Robert Douglas by M.J. Jordan
Walter Douglas by Charles Mackay
Sergeant Tim Meehan by Charles Bowser
"Downey Dick" by Joseph A. Wilks
Bye-Bye by Harry Booker
Millicent Douglas by Dora Goldthwaite
Alice Rodney by Isabelle Evesson
Madame Biff by Adele Palma

References

1888 plays
Broadway plays